Taste Test may refer to:
"Taste Test", a song by Sleater-Kinney from their 1996 album Call the Doctor
Blind wine tasting, a wine taste test involving no knowledge of the wine's identity on the part of the tasters
Blind taste test, a generic term for any blind testing that involves tasting.